The Vruwink MotorCycles company, short VMC, is a Dutch Sidecarcross frame manufacturer, having won eleven riders and six manufacturers world championships in this sport.

Company history

VMC was formed in 1984 by a Dutchman of the name Vruwink, who gave the company its name. The company had and has only two employees and is specialised in making sidecarcross frames.

In 1995, VMC was bought by a Belgian with the name of Bakens, who still owns it as of 2008.

As of the end of 2010, the company has eleven riders world championships to its name. From 2004 to 2009, the company also won six manufacturers championships in a row and a seventh one in 2011.

Honours
 Manufacturers World Championships: (7) 2004–09, 2011
 Riders world championships (11)
 Christoph Hüsser / Andreas Hüsser; KTM-VMC 1988, 1989
 Andreas Fuhrer / Adrian Käser; Kawasaki-VMC 1993, 1994
 Daniël Willemsen / Kaspars Stupelis; Zabel-VMC 2003, 2004
 Daniël Willemsen / Sven Verbrugge; Zabel-VMC 2005, 2006
 Daniël Willemsen / Reto Grütter; Zabel-VMC 2007, 2008
 Joris Hendrickx / Kaspars Liepiņš; KTM-VMC 2009

References

External links
 VMC company website
 The world championship on sidecarcross.com
 The official FIM website

Motorcycle manufacturers of the Netherlands
Sidecarcross
Vehicle manufacturing companies established in 1984
Dutch companies established in 1984